Damien Gerard Timmer (born 20 October 1968 in Chelsea, London) is an English Joint-Managing Director of British independent production company Mammoth Screen, which was established in 2007. He has executive produced Lost in Austen, Wuthering Heights, Bouquet of Barbed Wire and Endeavour for ITV, and Margot, Blandings, Remember Me, Poldark and Christopher and His Kind for the BBC. Monroe is a new series for ITV. Parade's End is a major 5 part serial by Tom Stoppard being made for the BBC in 2011.

Damien Timmer also executive produces Marple, Poirot and Lewis for ITV, and executive produced The Prisoner with AMC / ITV Productions.

Previously, Damien Timmer was head of Granada London Drama, where he was responsible for executive producing Housewife, 49, If I Had You, Dracula, Ballet Shoes and Russell T Davies’ Casanova, starring David Tennant, made by Red Productions.

References

External links

1968 births
English businesspeople
Living people
British television producers
English television producers
People from Chelsea, London
ITV people